The immigrans-tripunctata radiation is a speciose lineage of Drosophila flies, including over 300 species. The immigrans-tripunctata radiation is a sister lineage to most other members of the subgenus Drosophila. A number of species have had their genomes or transcriptomes sequenced for evolutionary studies using Drosophila.

Species groups

The following species groups and numbers largely derive from O'Grady (2018).

 Immigrans species group (106 species)
 Tripunctata species group (83 species)
 Quinaria species group (35 species)
 Guarani species group (24 species)
 Cardini species group (16 species)
 Calloptera species group (8 species)
 Bizonata species group (7 species)
 Funebris species group (7 species)
 Testacea species group (4 species)

Sequenced genomes or transcriptomes

The following species have extensive genetic sequence data available. [Last updated: 24 August 2019]

Quinaria species group
 Drosophila guttifera
 Drosophila innubila
 Drosophila falleni
 Drosophila phalerata

Immigrans species group
 Drosophila albomicans

Testacea species group
 Drosophila neotestacea

Gallery

References

Drosophila
Insect species groups